The 1965 Humboldt State Lumberjacks football team represented Humboldt State College during the 1965 NCAA College Division football season. Humboldt State competed in the Far Western Conference (FWC).

The 1965 Lumberjacks were led by head coach Phil Sarboe in his 15th and last year at the helm. They played home games at the Redwood Bowl in Arcata, California. Humboldt State finished with a record of six wins and four losses (6–4, 2–3 FWC). The Lumberjacks were outscored by their opponents 128–131 for the season.

Phil Sarboe's tenure at Humboldt State was the most successful in school history. He is the only coach to win over 100 games at Humboldt State, finishing 104–37–5. His winning percentage is the highest in school history, and his teams had 13 winning seasons and only one losing season. The Lumberjacks won or shared the conference championship in five of his 15 seasons (1952, 1956, 1960, 1961, & 1963).

Schedule

Notes

References

Humboldt State
Humboldt State Lumberjacks football seasons
Humboldt State Lumberjacks football